Silvanus or Sylvanus may refer to:
Silas (Silvanus), disciple, mentioned in four New Testament epistles
Silvanus (monk), one of the Desert Fathers
Silvanus of the Seventy, a traditional figure in Eastern Orthodox tradition assumed to be one of the Seventy Apostles
Silvanus (mythology), a Roman tutelary deity or spirit of woods and fields
Silvanus (name), a surname and given name (and list of people with the name)
Silvanus (Forgotten Realms), a fictional deity in the Forgotten Realms setting of Dungeons & Dragons
Sylvanus, Michigan, a village
Silvanus (genus), a genus of beetles

See also
Teachings of Silvanus, a text from the Nag Hammadi library
Sylvanus Selleck Gristmill, a gristmill built in 1796 in Greenwich, Connecticut
Sylvanus Thayer Award, an award that is given each year by the United States Military Academy at West Point
Silvain (disambiguation)
Silvan (disambiguation)
Sylvain (disambiguation)